Carangola is a Brazilian municipality in the state of Minas Gerais. The city belongs to the mesoregion of Zona da Mata. It is a university town, a main urban hub, and a commercial and industrial region.

See also
 List of municipalities in Minas Gerais

References

Municipalities in Minas Gerais